Denis Buntić (born 13 November 1982) is a retired Croatian handball player.

He is a retired player of the Croatian national team. Buntić was born in Ljubuški, SR Bosnia and Herzegovina, SFR Yugoslavia. He won the silver medal at the 2005 World Championship in Tunisia, and also the silver at the 2009 World Championship on home soil. He was part of the Croatian team that won the bronze medal at the 2012 Summer Olympics.

Honours
Izviđač
Premier League of Bosnia and Herzegovina: 1999-00, 2001–02, 2003-2004, 2004–05
Cup of Bosnia and Herzegovina: 1999, 2002

Cimos Koper
Slovenian Cup: 2008

Ademar León
Copa ASOBAL: 2009

Vive Targi Kielce
EHF Champions League
Winner: 2015–16
Third: 2012–13, 2014–15

Orders
 Order of the Croatian Trefoil - 2005

References

External links
Profile at Vive Targi Kielce official website
European Handball Federation official data

1982 births
Living people
Croatian male handball players
Croats of Bosnia and Herzegovina
Liga ASOBAL players
CB Ademar León players
RK Medveščak Zagreb players
SC Pick Szeged players
Vive Kielce players
Handball players at the 2012 Summer Olympics
Olympic handball players of Croatia
Olympic bronze medalists for Croatia
Olympic medalists in handball
Medalists at the 2012 Summer Olympics
Mediterranean Games silver medalists for Croatia
Competitors at the 2005 Mediterranean Games
Expatriate handball players in Poland
People from Ljubuški
Mediterranean Games medalists in handball